Antonio "Tonypet" Taguinod Albano is a Filipino politician. He is the chairman of Radio Philippines Network Inc. from 2008 to 2010. He is the president and CEO of Radio Philippines Network Inc. from 2009 to 2012. He was Vice Governor of Isabela from 2013 to 2019. He currently serves as a member of the Philippine House of Representatives representing the 1st District of Isabela.

Political career

House of Representatives (2019 - present) 
He is one of the 70 lawmakers who voted to reject the franchise of ABS-CBN.

References

External links 
 Official Facebook page

Living people
Members of the House of Representatives of the Philippines from Isabela (province)
Year of birth missing (living people)
Radio Philippines Network people